Gumdi is a village development committee in Dhading District in the Bagmati Zone of central Nepal. At the time of the 1991 Nepal census it had a population of 5091 and had 898 houses in it.

See also
Gumdi.com - Daily New GazabPost

References

Populated places in Dhading District